A forced free trial is a direct-marketing technique, usually for goods sold by regular subscription, in which potential buyers are sent a number of free samples of a product, usually periodic publications. Quite often publishers distribute free copies and the reader is not even asked to subscribe. His address appears on a piece of paper that goes out with the mag – a label carrier that could so easily contain a promotional message. The copies are being sent out anyway, so the postage is already paid: the additional cost of promotion is negligible. And when the reader subscribes, you’ve already got his name and address pre-printed on the form. Add in some cross-selling opportunities (e.g., conference, directory or newsletter) and the lifetime value can be huge – from a subscriber that cost you just pence to acquire.

It is said that announcing a three-issue free trial and sending out a fourth issue works well to ensure good subscription rates. There are several places in which free trials can be found. Free trials are used by many different companies offering products and services. It is a marketing and advertising move in which the company or maker of said product or service is so confident in their offering that they give it to you in a trial test format. Once you make up your mind that you do like the product or service which you tried the company knows they will have your business.

However a free trial in exchange for credit card details can not be stated as a free trial, as there is a component of expenditure.

References 

Direct marketing
Marketing techniques